GRCC can refer to:
Grand Rapids Community College
Green River Community College